Local elections were held in Elgeyo-Marakwet County to elect a Governor and County Assembly on 4 March 2013. Under the new constitution, which was passed in a 2010 referendum, the 2013 general elections were the first in which Governors and members of the County Assemblies for the newly created counties were elected.

Gubernatorial election

Prospective candidates
The following are some of the candidates who have made public their intentions to run: 
 Joseph Litamoi
 Nicholas Chepkiyeng
 Thomas Torosi
 Alex Tolgos
 Pius Kipkore
 Gabriel Bargechir 
 Simon Komen
 Moses Changwony - former Tana River Development Authority managing director 
 Joel Kiboss - former Egerton University lecturer
 Abraham Talel -  former Kenya Revenue Authority commissioner 
 Yano Pangana
 Timothy Biwott
 Albert Kochei.

References

 

2013 local elections in Kenya